Velvet was a Filipino cable television network based in Quezon City. It was owned and operated by Creative Programs, Inc. (now ABS-CBN Cable Channels), a wholly owned subsidiary of the media conglomerate ABS-CBN Corporation. The primary focus of the network was into women-oriented general entertainment programming.

Channel Information
Velvet had a sneak preview on SkyCable channel 25 since November 2007, together with Maxxx and Balls. Velvet was officially launched on January 1, 2008. Velvet also aired selected shows on Studio 23 (now S+A).

The channel went off the air at the midnight on January 1, 2014. Miss Universe 2013 was the last program of Velvet before it permanently signed off.

Most of the channel's programming and specials were moved to Lifestyle (now Metro Channel).

Description
Velvet is the result after the contract of Solar Entertainment's 2nd Avenue expired with SkyCable. Velvet is fairly similar in theme and audiences with ETC and 2nd Avenue typically appealing to the female-audience genre with a range from pre-adolescent to the late-thirties age bracket . Velvet features programs based on entertainment news & specials, game shows, stand-up comedy acts, drama, reality series and award shows.

Final Program Line-Up

Series
 10 Things I Hate About You
 18 to Life
 90210 (Season 1 to 5)
 A Gifted Man
 Accidentally on Purpose
 American Princess
 All About Aubrey
 America's Next Top Model (Cycles 1 to 12)
 America's Prom Queen
 The Apprentice (Season 4 to 7)
 Asia's Next Top Model
 Australia's Next Top Model
 Awkward.
 Bad Girls Club (Seasons 8 & 9)
 Big Day
 Big Love
 Big Rich Texas
 Biography
 Blue Bloods (Seasons 1 to 3)
 Blush: The Search for the Next Great Makeup Artist
 Born to Dance
 Bridalplasty
 Brothers & Sisters (Season 5)
 Britain's Next Top Model
 Canada's Next Top Model
 CBS Evening News
 Celebrity Apprentice (Seasons 5 to 7)
 Celebrity Fit Club
 Charmed
 The Choice
 The Comeback
 Comedy Central Roast
 Cougar Town
 Crossing Jordan
 Crowned
 Dallas Divas & Daughters
 Dance Moms
 Denise Richards: It's Complicated
 Dexter (Seasons 4 & 5)
 Dirt
 Dirty Soap
 Don't Forget the Lyrics!
 Downtown Girls
 E! News Weekend
 E! True Hollywood Story
 Excused
 Extreme Close-Up
 Extreme Makeover: Home Edition
 Everybody Loves Raymond
 Fashion Police
 Five Days
 Fly Girls
 Geordie Shore
 Gigantic
 Girlfriends
 Girls Who Like Boys Who Like Boys
 Gigolos
 Glamour Belles
 Good Morning America
 The Good Wife (Seasons 1 to 4)
 Got to Dance (Seasons 1 to 4)
 Harper's Island
 The Hasselhoffs
 Hawaii Five-0 (Seasons 1 to 3)
 Hey Paula
 High Society
 Holly's World
 Hollyscoop
 Hollywood Squares
 House of Lies (Seasons 1 to 2)
 Huff
 Huge
 I Know Kids Like a Star
 I Really Knew Me
 I Want To Be a Hilton
 I'm a Celebrity...Get Me Out of Here!
 Ice Loves Coco
 Iconoclasts
 Inside the Actors Studio
 Is She Really Going Out with Him?
 The Janice Dickinson Modeling Agency (Season 3)
 Jeopardy!
 Jersey Shore (Seasons 1 to 4)
 Judging Amy
 Keeping Up with the Kardashians (Seasons 1 to 6)
 Kell on Earth
 Kid Nation
 Kourtney and Khloé Take Miami
 Kourtney and Kim Take New York
 Khloé & Lamar
 Life Unexpected
 Living Lohan
 Lost in Austen
 Louie Spence's Showbusiness
 Love You To Death
 Made in Chelsea
 Make It or Break It
 Make Me a Supermodel U. K.
 Married to Rock
 Medium
 Mel B: It's a Scarry World
 Melrose Place
 Miss Guided
 Mobbed
 The Mortified Sessions
 Nearly Famous
 The Next Best Thing
 The Nine Lives of Chloe King
 No Ordinary Party
 Nurse Jackie (Seasons 1 to 4)
 Old Skool with Terry & Gita
 On The Red Carpet
 On The Road with Austin & Santino
 Paradise Hotel
 Perfect Catch
 Pineapple Dance Studios
 Pretty Wild
 Queen Bees
 The Real Housewives of Beverly Hills (Seasons to 3)
 The Real Housewives of Miami (Seasons 1 & 2)
 Reality Hell
 Ringer
 Running In Heels
 Running Russell Simmons
 RuPaul's Drag Race (Seasons 3, 4 & 5)
 The Sarah Silverman Program
 Savannah
 The Secret Lives of Dancers
 Secrets of Aspen
 Shear Genius (Season 2)
 Shedding for the Wedding
 The Short List
 The Sing-Off
 So You Think You Can Dance (Seasons 5 to 9)
 The Soup and The Soup Presents
 Spelling Manor Series
 The Spin Crowd
 Streets of Hollywood
 Style by June
 Stylista
 Summerland
 Tabatha's Salon Takeover (Season 2)
 Tell Me You Love Me
 Texas Women
 'Til Death
 Tipping the Velvet
 Three Rivers
 Tough Love (Seasons 4 & 5)
 Work of Art: The Next Great Artist
 Unleashed by Garo
 Victoria Silvstedt: My Perfect Life
 The View
 Watch Over Me
 Wheel of Fortune
 When Women Rule the World
 Whittaker Bay
 Wife Swap
 Wildest TV Show Moments
 Will & Grace
 Worst Week

Movies and Entertainment Specials
 FlickFest Matinee
 Flick Pick
 Spotlight
 Velvet Entertainment Specials

Annual Events & Specials
 Binibining Pilipinas (2012)
 BRIT Awards 2012
 The Comedy Awards (2011–2013)
 Oscars (2008–2013)
 Club Elite 2012
 The Royal Variety Performance 2011
 Elite Model Look (2011)
 Primetime Emmy Awards (2008–2013)
 Guys' Choice Awards (2012)
 Miss Universe (2008–2013)
 Screen Actors Guild Awards (2011)
 Teen Choice Awards (2011–2012)
 Tony Awards (2008–2009; 2012–2013)
 Victoria's Secret Fashion Show (2010–2012)

References

External links
 Official website

Creative Programs
Defunct television networks in the Philippines
Women's interest channels
English-language television stations in the Philippines
Television channels and stations established in 2008
Television channels and stations disestablished in 2014
2008 establishments in the Philippines
2014 disestablishments in the Philippines
ABS-CBN Corporation channels